Kenneth Douglas Meuleman (5 September 1923 – 10 September 2004) was an Australian cricketer who played in one Test match in 1946. His cricket career started in Victoria, but after moving to Perth, Western Australia, he established himself as an important member of the State Sheffield Shield team between 1945/46 and 1960/61.  He captained the side for a number of seasons.

He also established a still operating sporting goods store in Perth called Meuleman's Cricket Centre as well as coaching and development of the sport including particularly the development of Justin Langer. Born to parents of German ancestry, his son Robert Meuleman and grandson Scott Meuleman have also played for Western Australia.

See also
 One Test Wonder

References

External links

1923 births
2004 deaths
Australia Test cricketers
Victoria cricketers
Western Australia cricketers
Commonwealth XI cricketers
Australian cricketers
Cricketers from Melbourne
Australian people of German descent
D. G. Bradman's XI cricketers